was a Japanese netsuke carver. His work can be seen at the Los Angeles County Museum of Art.

References

1746 births
Netsuke-shi
Year of death unknown